Liv Bona Dea Hospital opened in 27 March 2018 in Baku, Azerbaijan. It consists of seven floors, with an area of 37,500 m². The opening ceremony was attended by the President of the Republic of Azerbaijan Ilham Aliyev and first lady Mehriban Aliyeva.

References

Hospitals in Azerbaijan